"On My Way Home" is a song by Irish new-age artist Enya. It was released as the second and final single from her fourth studio album, The Memory Of Trees (1995). The song achieved minor success, reaching #26 on the UK Singles Chart in December 1996, but in Brazil, it was a top 5 hit, reaching number four. According to Enya, the song is about "those wonderful memories and fond moments that you have when you're on your way home", and wished to present a positive feel in the chorus. The song contains samples from two other Enya songs, "Book of Days" and "Orinoco Flow".

Critical reception
Larry Flick from Billboard described the song as a "sweeping excursion into soothing new-age pop." He added, "Enya's dreamy, angelic voice is sewn into a quasi-classical arrangement of strings and acoustic guitars. Her performance ultimately grounds the song, as the music takes flight and winds through countless highs and lows. An excellent way to ring in the holiday season without resorting to "Jingle Bells" too soon." Mike Joyce from The Washington Post felt that "On My Way Home" "boasts a thoroughly engaging chorus and closes the album on a cheerful note."

Track listing

Note: A version used in the music video runs for 4 minutes and 26 seconds.

Charts

References

External links

Enya songs
Songs with lyrics by Roma Ryan
Songs with music by Enya
1996 singles
1995 songs
Reprise Records singles
Pop ballads